The American Samoa women's national under-20 football team is the highest women's youth team of women's football in American Samoa and is controlled by the Football Federation American Samoa (FFAS).

History
American Samoa is known as one of the worst football teams in the world. In that perspective their debut at the OFC U-20 Women's Championship was quite good. They made their debut in 2002 at the first tournament ever held. They managed to draw two times with only one loss: just 2–0 against giants New Zealand. The team managed to score two goals in their 2–2 draw against Samoa. They ended up 3 out of 4 in the group, above Fiji.

Eight years later, in 2010, the team struggled a whole lot more. They lost all their three games: two 4-0 defeats against Tonga and the Cook Islands and an 8–0 defeat against New Zealand.

After two tournaments the American Samoa team has never won and just scored two goals. However they will participate again in 2019.

OFC Championship Record

Current squad
The following players were called up for the 2019 OFC U-19 Women's Championship from 30 August – 12 September in Avarua, Cook Islands.

Caps and goals updated as of 7 September 2019, after the game against New Zealand.

References

Oceanian women's national under-20 association football teams
women's
Women in American Samoa